Torture chamber may refer to:
Torture chamber, a place where torture is carried out
Torture Chamber, a 2013 horror film by Dante Tomaselli
"Torture Chamber," a song by Edan from his 2005 album  Beauty and the Beat